Stephan Reimertz (born 4 March 1962) is a German poet, essayist, novelist and art historian.

Life 
Born in Aachen, Germany, Reimertz is the grandnephew of Nikolaus Groß, resistance fighter in the 20th July plot against Hitler. His grandfather was a democratic major and politician from Westphalia. His father was a mining engineer and met his mother at RWTH Aachen; she was a pharmacist from Riga and of Baltic German ethnicity. Reimertz was raised at his grandmothers in the medieval village of Niederwenigern on the Ruhr Peninsula, later attended school in Kronberg, where he joined the  Catholic Boy Scouts.

A grantee of the German National Merit Foundation, the German Academic Exchange Service, etc., Reimertz went to college at LMU Munich and graduated with an MA in comparative literature and a doctorate in art history and philosophy from FU Berlin. He has taught at Juniata College in Huntingdon, Pennsylvania, and was a Fulbright grantee at University of Texas at Austin, and a research fellow at Washington University in St. Louis. Reimertz dedicated a monograph to Woody Allen and the American cinema.

Works 

In art history, Reimertz followed Hans Sedlmayr’s method of structural analysis (Strukturanalyse), calling on the discipline of art history to move past empirical research and reveal the aesthetic nature of the artwork. His monograph on the German artist Max Beckmann connects structural analysis with a cultural historiographic narrative and is considered a benchmark in modern art history.

Reimertz’s first novel, Eine Liebe im Portrait ("A Love in Portraiture"), was released in 1996, featuring the fate of the artist Minna Tube, a painter who became a celebrated mezzo-soprano after her husband Max Beckmann had banned her from painting. Reimertz set up a new style of Realroman ("reality novel"), using only authentic quotations and composing them in an artistic narrative structure, thus combining the French tradition of biographie romancée with the German classical forms of Künstlerroman and Bildungsroman.

In 2001, Stephan Reimertz authored Papiergewicht ("Paper Weight"), an autobiographical novel set in a decadent upper-class family, reflecting the social changes of the early Seventies.

Selected bibliography 
The books he has written are:

Novels
 Eine Liebe im Porträt. Rowohlt, Reinbek 1996.  
 Papiergewicht. Luchterhand, Munich 2001, 
 Die Frauenfalle. Hey Publishing, Munich 2013,

Non Fiction
 Max Beckmann, (rororo-Monographie). Rowohlt, Reinbek 1995. 
 Vom Genuß des Tees. Eine heitere Reise durch alte Landschaften, ehrwürdige Traditionen und moderne Verhältnisse, inklusive einer kleinen Teeschule. Gustav Kiepenheuer, Leipzig 1998,  
 Woody Allen. Eine Biographie. Rowohlt, Reinbek 2000,  
 Max Beckmann. Biographie. Luchterhand, Munich 2003. 
 Woody Allen (rororo-Monographie). Rowohlt, Reinbek 2005,

References

External links 
 Random House Site on Stephan Reimertz
 Lyricswelt Encyclopedia Entry

1962 births
Living people
20th-century German novelists
21st-century German novelists
German art historians
Studienstiftung alumni
People of Baltic German descent
People from Aachen
German male novelists
20th-century German male writers
21st-century German male writers
German male non-fiction writers
Washington University in St. Louis fellows
Ludwig Maximilian University of Munich alumni
Free University of Berlin alumni
Juniata College faculty